Stuart Willmott (born 4 June 1964) is a male retired British swimmer.

Swimming career
He competed in the 1500 metres freestyle and 400 metres medley events at the 1984 Summer Olympics, but did not reach the finals. At the ASA National British Championships he won the 200 metres medley title in 1985

Personal life
He is married to Alison and has two daughters, Chloe  and Aimee; both are competitive swimmers, and Aimee has competed at the 2012 Summer Olympics. He works as a swimming coach at the Middlesbrough Amateur Swimming Club. His daughters train at the same club, but with different coaches.

References

1964 births
Living people
English male swimmers
English male freestyle swimmers
Olympic swimmers of Great Britain
Swimmers at the 1984 Summer Olympics
Sportspeople from London
Male medley swimmers